Xırxatala ) is a village and municipality in the Qabala District of Azerbaijan. It has a population of 1,392.

References 

Populated places in Qabala District